DXLA-TV (also known as GMA TV-9 Zamboanga, GMA Zamboanga or GMA Western Mindanao) is a commercial television station owned by GMA Network Inc. Its studio complex is located at GNC Building, Sto. Niño Village, Brgy. Putik, Zamboanga City; while its transmitter is located at GMA Compound Brgy. Cabatangan, Zamboanga City.

History
 Channel 9 Zamboanga was launched by First United Broadcasting Corporation in 1974 (now Global Satellite Technology Services). At that time, it was originally an affiliate of BBC/City2 from 1974 to 1986 then it later became an affiliate of ABS-CBN for the Zamboanga Peninsula area when BBC was shut down due to sequestration by the government. Programs were aired from 12:00 noon to 11:00pm, weekdays, and 9:00am to 12:00 m.n. on weekends. Local programming aired then on FUBC-9 were Cuentas Claras and FUBC News, the former affiliate of the national newscasts TV Patrol and The World Tonight. TV-9 carried a variant of the Star Network identification package in 1988–1989 in conjunction with the debut of satellite transmissions to the Sulu Archipelago and the entire Zamboanga Peninsula bringing a mix of both local and national programming, with the white star holding the tail of the white colored number 9 (later tri-colored in red, green and blue matching the national idents, but the numerical 3 was changed in early 1995).
 On January 1, 1995, ABS-CBN bought rival station DXLL-TV channel 3 from its owner RT Broadcasting. To consummate for the purchase, network affiliations were swapped between ABS-CBN and FUBC; with the former becoming an owned and operated station, and FUBC picking up the GMA affiliation on channel 9. GMA later picked up the Channel 9 frequency a year later. Since the station's consummation, GMA Zamboanga served as a relay station of flagship DZBB-TV channel 7 in Metro Manila, with limited local advertising.
 On August 28, 2017, GMA Zamboanga was reassigned to form the network's Mindanao super region. As part of the new development, it began simulcasting the first ever Mindanao-wide newscast One Mindanao, originating from GMA Davao (Channel 5), targeting the Chavacano-speaking interviewees of Zamboanga City besides Cebuano.
 On October 14, 2021, GMA Regional TV proudly announced the launch of GMA Network’s 4th regional station in Mindanao and 10th in the country. The station’s newscasts will be part of GMA Regional TV’s One Mindanao initiative where news is reported for Mindanaoans by Mindanaoans.
On October 12, 2022, GMA Zamboanga successfully began conducting digital test broadcasts on UHF 41 covering Zamboanga City, as well as several parts of Basilan, Zamboanga del Norte, and Zamboanga Sibugay.

GMA TV-9 Zamboanga current programs
 One Mindanao
 At Home with GMA Regional TV

Current personalities
Efren Mamac - GMA Zamboanga correspondent
Krissa Marie Dapitan - GMA Zamboanga correspondent
GMA Zamboanga selected correspondent carried over to One Mindanao of GMA Davao

Former personalities
Jayvee Francisco - GMA News Stringer

Digital television

Digital channels
UHF Channel 41 (635.143 MHz)

Areas of coverage 

 Zamboanga City
 Basilan
 Portion of Zamboanga Sibugay
 Portion of Zamboanga del Norte

Rebroadcaster

See also
List of GMA Network stations
Global Satellite Technology Services

References

Television stations in Zamboanga City
GMA Network stations
Television channels and stations established in 1974
Digital television stations in the Philippines